Beryanak Metro Station is a station in Tehran Metro Line 7. It is located on the western side of Navvab Expressway. In 2022 a new gate was made south of the old one

References

Tehran Metro stations
Railway stations opened in 2017